Tarzan on the Planet of the Apes is a 2016 comic book miniseries combining the Tarzan and Planet of the Apes media franchises.

Plot
In an alternate take on Escape from the Planet of the Apes where Cornelius, Zira and Dr. Milo travel to late-1800s Africa instead of the 1970s, the apes become the leaders of the Mangani and Caesar and Tarzan are raised as brothers. However, as Tarzan grows up and humans arrive in the jungle, they are separated by slave traders. Eventually they reunite when the war between man and ape takes them from the jungles of Africa to the inner earth realm of Pellucidar.

Reception

The series has gained mostly positive critical reviews.

See also
 Tarzan in comics
 Planet of the Apes (comics)

References

2016 comics debuts
Intercompany crossovers
Planet of the Apes
Dark Horse Comics titles
Works based on Tarzan
Boom! Studios titles